This is a list of the seasons played by FK Lovćen from 1913, when the club was founded. The club's achievements in all major national competitions are listed.

Seasons 1913-1937

Appearances
As the oldest Montenegrin football club, Lovćen participated in its first national competitions in the 1910s and 1920s. Exact results from the period 1913-1937 are not available, but below is the list of seasons and competitions in which participated FK Lovćen before World War II.

Source: http://www.fklovcen.me/?page_id=10
At 1937, regime of Kingdom of Yugoslavia prohibited work of FK Lovćen and FK Budućnost, because they were named as Workers' football clubs. That was the end of FK Lovćen participation in the official competitions until the end of World War II.

Honours and achievements

Montenegrin championship - Elimination tournament for Montenegrin football clubs; 'Zeta olympiad' - Cup tournament for Montenegrin football clubs; 'Sports olympiad' - tournament held on Cetinje, with participation of clubs from Montenegro, Albania and Austro-Hungaria.

Seasons 1946-

Overall
Most of their seasons, Lovćen spent in the second and third football level in SFR Yugoslavia and, after that, in FR Yugoslavia. In the 1940s and 1950s, Lovćen participated in the Yugoslav First League playoffs, but without promotion to the top-tier. After Montenegrin independence, the club made their first appearances in the First League (since the season 2007-08).

Source:

Seasons in domestic competitions

Championship

Final placement by seasons
From 1946, FK Lovćen played 74 seasons in domestic leagues of SFR Yugoslavia, FR Yugoslavia, Serbia and Montenegro and Montenegro. 
Below is a list of FK Lovćen final placements by every single season.

Playoffs
At the end of nine seasons, FK Lovćen played in the playoffs for placement in the First Yugoslav League and Second Yugoslav League. Three times, Lovćen played playoffs for the First Yugoslav League promotion.

National Cup
FK Lovćen participated in 21 season of national Cup competition, since 1950. During their history, Budućnost played in Yugoslav Cup, FR Yugoslavia Cup and, since the 2006-07 season, in Montenegrin Cup.
Lovćen played three times in the final matches of national cup - (2008/09, 2013/14 and 2018/19). Club won one trophy, in the season 2013/14.

* - penalties

See also
 FK Lovćen
 FK Lovćen in the First League
 FK Lovćen in European competitions
 Montenegrin clubs in Yugoslav football competitions (1946–2006)
 Cetinje

References

External links
 FK Lovćen official website
 FK Lovćen official page
 FK Lovćen at Twitter
 UEFA profile
 Soccerway profile

FK Lovćen Cetinje
Lovćen Cetinje